Ballymully Glebe is a townland in County Tyrone, Northern Ireland. It is situated in the historic barony of Dungannon Upper and the civil parish of Desertcreat and covers an area of 144 acres.

The name derives from the Irish: Baile Mullaigh (town of the summit or farmstead of the summit).

The population of the townland declined during the 19th century:

The townland contains one Scheduled Historic Monument: Tullyhogue Fort (grid ref: H8251 7428).

See also
List of townlands of County Tyrone
List of archaeological sites in County Tyrone

References

Townlands of County Tyrone
Archaeological sites in County Tyrone
Civil parish of Desertcreat